Jonathan Kiriisa (born 23 June 1959) is a Ugandan boxer. He competed in the men's light heavyweight event at the 1984 Summer Olympics.

Professional boxing record

References

External links
 

1959 births
Living people
Ugandan male boxers
Olympic boxers of Uganda
Boxers at the 1984 Summer Olympics
Place of birth missing (living people)
Light-heavyweight boxers
Commonwealth Games medallists in boxing
Commonwealth Games silver medallists for Uganda
Boxers at the 1982 Commonwealth Games
Medallists at the 1982 Commonwealth Games